Sergio Berger (born 1 January 1983 in Schiers) is a Swiss snowboarder. He placed 25th in the men's halfpipe event at the 2010 Winter Olympics.

References

1983 births
Living people
Swiss male snowboarders
Olympic snowboarders of Switzerland
Snowboarders at the 2010 Winter Olympics